|}

The Ganton Stakes is a Listed flat horse race in Great Britain open to horses aged three years or older.
It is run at York over a distance of 7 furlongs and 192 yards (1,584 metres), and it is scheduled to take place each year in June.

The race was first run in 2012.

Winners

See also 
Horse racing in Great Britain
List of British flat horse races

References

Racing Post:

Flat races in Great Britain
York Racecourse
Open mile category horse races
Recurring sporting events established in 2012
2012 establishments in England